Maletsunyane Falls is a  waterfall in the Southern African country Lesotho. It is located near the town of Semonkong (Site of smoke), which also is named after the falls. The waterfall is on the Maletsunyane River and it falls from a ledge of Triassic-Jurassic basalt.

The plunging water creates a reverberating echo when it contact the basin of the falls, and local legend has it that the sound comes from the wailing of people who have drowned in the falls.

In December 2017, the Australian YouTube channel How Ridiculous broke the record for the world's highest basketball shot at Maletsunyane Falls. This stands as the current world record.

See also 
 List of waterfalls
 List of waterfalls by type

References

Waterfalls of Lesotho